Major Herbert Leslie Melville Tritton (1870-1940), was a British banker.

Early life
Herbert Leslie Melville Tritton was born 20 December 1870. He was the son of the banker Joseph Herbert Tritton.

Career
Tritton served as the president of The Equitable Life Assurance Society from 1930 to 1940. Additionally, he served as a director of Barclays Bank and chairman of Barclays Bank International from 1934 to 1937.

He was High Sheriff of Essex from 1933 to 1934.

Personal life
He married Gertrude Susan Gosset. They had four children:
 Lucy Constance Tritton (1895- )
 Marjorie Gertrude Tritton (1897- )
 Ralph Leslie Tritton (1900-1929)
 George Henton Tritton (1905-1934)

Death
He died 21 November 1940.

References

1870 births
1940 deaths
Barclays people
British corporate directors
English bankers
High Sheriffs of Essex
Herbert